The Seal Island Bridge is a bridge located in Victoria County, Nova Scotia. It is the third longest bridge span in the province.

The bridge is a through arch design and crosses the Great Bras d'Or channel of Bras d'Or Lake, connecting Boularderie Centre, Boularderie Island on the south side with New Harris, Cape Breton Island on the north side.

Construction
Construction of the Seal Island Bridge began in 1960 as part of the Trans-Canada Highway project. The bridge, officially known as the Great Bras d'Or Crossing, was completed in 1961 at a cost of $4,652,850. The bridge is a crucial link in the Trans Canada Highway between Sydney and Baddeck, carrying more than 7,500 vehicles a day in peak periods. The structure carries two traffic lanes of Highway 105 and was originally constructed with a pedestrian sidewalk on each side.

The bridge crosses part of the channel on a causeway connecting the north shore of the channel to Seal Island, a small wooded island. The structure consists of eight steel box truss spans, three simply supported  approach spans, two simply-supported  splay spans, and a three-span continuous main span that consists of two  side spans and a  centre arch span. The steel structure is supported on tall reinforced concrete piers, armoured with cut stone at the waterline.

Closures due to wind
Due to the bridge's height and location in a deep valley that can funnel winds, the Seal Island Bridge occasionally is closed to high-sided vehicles such as transport trucks. There have been a number of incidents on the bridge over the years with winds toppling transport trucks. At times these closures can last for a number of hours, causing traffic to back up. RCMP will stop high-sided vehicles at the bridge and inform they cannot cross. At times as many as 15 to 20 transport trucks can be lined up, waiting for conditions to improve so they can make the crossing.

Controversy
The location of the bridge had proven controversial. It replaced two ferry services crossing the Great Bras d'Or; one at the northeastern end between New Campbellton-Big Bras d'Or, and the other at the southwestern end at Big Harbour-Ross Ferry.

For political reasons, it was decided to place the bridge halfway between the two ferry services on account of an outcry by communities fearing the loss of their transportation links. Unfortunately, this required an extensive modification to the Trans-Canada Highway route on the eastern slope of Kelly's Mountain ( high), resulting in a 180° "switchback".

A safer alternative to continue the highway further east on a gradual descent of Kelly's Mountain toward New Campbellton, crossing at the northern end of the Great Bras d'Or channel was rejected. Likewise, a route between Beinn Bhreagh and Kempt Head at the extreme southwestern end of the channel (much wider waterway but avoiding Kelly's Mountain altogether) was never considered. A number of serious accidents have occurred on Kelly's Mountain and at the switchback at the base of the grade over the years, as many as six or seven accidents taking place in some years.

Deck replacement
By 2001, it was found the existing cast-in-place concrete bridge deck was in poor condition. Forty years of wear and tear from traffic as well as exposure to wind and salt spray necessitated a major overhaul of the Seal Island Bridge. The road deck needed complete replacement, and the steel truss work needed reinforcement. Engineers thoroughly inspected the rest of the bridge structure and found it to be sound and safe.

A major deck replacement project was undertaken. Over the next three years, the original cast-in-place concrete bridge deck was removed and replaced using full-depth, precast, prestressed, half-deck width concrete panels. It was necessary to complete one lane at a time, starting with the south lane, leaving the other deck in place so the bridge could continue to be used for vehicular traffic. Construction was completed with minimal traffic disruptions, and the bridge remained open to single lane traffic throughout construction, with the exception of three, six-hour overnight closures planned per week. This project added several decades to the useful life of the bridge.

The new high performance precast concrete deck system is much more durable than conventional systems since it is less permeable and crack-free under service load conditions. The deck system adopted is significantly lighter than a conventional cast-in-place concrete deck system. This has resulted in considerable savings in the amount of truss reinforcement required, while providing sufficient mass and stiffness for damping purposes. At the same time the guard rails (traffic barriers) were replaced over the entire length of the bridge, with the new guard rails set inside the main bridge trusses to better protect them from vehicle impact. Unfortunately, this made the new bridge deck too narrow to retain the sidewalks, so they were not replaced. However, this modification did result in wider traffic lanes. The overall cost of the bridge deck reconstruction was $15 million. There are now "No pedestrian traffic" signs on each end of the bridge.

Awards
On April 20, 2004, it was announced the Seal Island Bridge Reconstruction Project had won the Lieutenant Governor's Award for Engineering Excellence. The Department of Transportation and Public Works shared the honours with consultants CBCL Limited of Halifax for the major overhaul of the province's third largest bridge.

Gallery

See also 
 List of bridges in Canada

References

External links
Structurae: Seal Island Bridge (1961)
Highway Cameras - Seal Island Bridge
Boularderie Island Historical Society - Photos of the Seal Island Bridge Under Construction, 1960

Road bridges in Nova Scotia
Transport in Victoria County, Nova Scotia
Buildings and structures in Victoria County, Nova Scotia
Bridges on the Trans-Canada Highway
Bridges completed in 1961
Through arch bridges in Canada